Since the initial publication of Mary Wollstonecraft Shelley's novel Frankenstein; or, The Modern Prometheus in 1818, there has existed uncertainty about the extent to which Mary Shelley's husband, Percy Bysshe Shelley, contributed to the text. While the novel was conceived and mainly written by Mary, Percy is known to have provided input in editing and publishing the manuscript. Some critics have alleged that Percy had a greater role—even the majority role—in the creation of the novel, though mainstream scholars have generally dismissed these claims as exaggerated or unsubstantiated. Based on a transcription of the original manuscript, it is currently believed that Percy contributed between 4,000 and 5,000 words to the 72,000 word novel.

Background
The first edition of Frankenstein; or, The Modern Prometheus was published anonymously on January 1, 1818 in London, with only a dedication to Mary Shelley's father, William Godwin. Several reviewers at the time—including Sir Walter Scott, writing for Blackwood's Edinburgh Magazine—incorrectly assumed Percy (Godwin's son-in-law) to be the author. In his communication with the book's publisher, Percy denied any role whatsoever in the writing of the book, and said that the manuscript had been "consigned to my care by a friend".

Mary Shelley was first credited by name in the 1821 French translation of the novel, entitled Frankenstein, ou le Prométhée moderne, which is attributed to "M.me Shelly ". The second English edition was published two years later in 1823 under the supervision of William Godwin. This edition credited "Mary Wollstonecraft Shelley" as the author, but did not credit Percy for contributing the Preface or his poem "Mutability", giving the  impression that Mary had written these as well. In the introduction to the 1831 edition, Mary Shelley states that she does not "owe the suggestion of one incident, nor scarcely of one train of feeling" to Percy. All subsequent editions credit Mary Shelley as the author, and the novel's revised 1831 edition credits Percy as the author of the Preface and "Mutability".

Questions about the extent of Percy Shelley's contributions were once again raised in 1974 by editor James Rieger, who alleges that Percy "worked on Frankenstein at every stage, from the earliest drafts through the printer's proofs", and suggests that he should be regarded at least as a "minor collaborator". In a 1990 essay, English professor Anne K. Mellor characterized Rieger's claims as biased and exaggerated, and deemed them "explicitly sexist" for implying that Mary Shelley could not have created the work on her own. Mellor would also continue to explain the theory in which Percy, was more likely the editor of the 1831 edition of the book. The same edition in which Mary Shelley had written her introduction.

In her 1993 book, Monstrous Imagination, American language professor Marie Hélène Huet draws attention to Percy Shelley's overlooked role as a general creative influence, noting especially the influence of Rousseau's La Nouvelle Héloïse on the novel, which Percy had read at the time of writing, but Mary had not. Huet also highlights several instances where Percy had replaced Mary's more plain diction with his own vocabulary, calling this "unimpeachable evidence" that Percy was—as Rieger claimed—at least a minor collaborator. She argues that Percy is responsible for the novel's themes of human procreation and sterility, and credits Percy for developing the contrast between the characters of Victor and Elizabeth, and the idea that Frankenstein should travel to England to create a female partner for his monster. Editor Duncan Wu disputes this, claiming that Mary had already established both ideas, and that Percy only suggested that the trip to England should be Victor's own idea, not his father's.

English professor Charles E. Robinson published a 2008 edition of the novel entitled The Original Frankenstein, which thoroughly documents Percy Shelley's additions and changes to Mary's original manuscript. This edition listed the author as "Mary Shelley (with Percy Shelley)", causing widespread media comment and discussion. In 2015, in The Neglected Shelley, Robinson examined Percy's allegedly significant contributions to the novel in greater detail.

Chronology

Authors have examined and investigated Percy Bysshe Shelley's scientific knowledge and experimentation, his two Gothic horror novels published in 1810 and 1811, his atheistic worldview, his antipathy to church and state, his 1818 Preface to Frankenstein, and his connection to the secret anti-Catholic organization, the Illuminati. These revelations showed that the novel drew inspiration from Shelley's life, background, his readings such as John Milton's Paradise Lost, Ruins of Empires (1791) by Constantin François de Chassebœuf, comte de Volney, which also informed "Ozymandias", also published in 1818, Sir Humphry Davy's Elements of Chemical Philosophy (1812), a textbook which Percy Bysshe Shelley owned, and the works of Dr. Erasmus Darwin, the grandfather of Charles Darwin, whom Shelley had earlier cited as a major influence in Queen Mab (1813), his views on religion, his poetic style, and his themes and ideas. In letters to William Godwin, Shelley also mentioned his affinity for Paracelsus, Albertus Magnus, and Heinrich Agrippa, "some of the physiological writers of Germany" cited in his 1818 Preface to Frankenstein. Based on its science, style, imagery, poetry, and language, some commentators have concluded that the novel's authorship is more likely Percy's rather than Mary's, though this interpretation is far from universal.

These arguments have been disputed as being mere coincidences. Leslie S. Klinger, in The New Annotated Frankenstein (2017), argued it is spurious to maintain "that the biographical coincidences of Victor Frankenstein and Percy Shelley are evidence of Percy's authorship". Instead, critics rely on the handwriting evidence and Mary's statements in the 1831 Introduction to the novel.

Proponents of Percy Shelley's authorship such as Scott de Hart and Joseph P. Farrell claim that he was obsessed with electricity, galvanism, and the reanimation of corpses, and point to the influence of James Lind, Percy Shelley's former teacher at Eton College. Advocates of Percy Shelley's authorship also point out that the novel contains his poetry such as "Mutability" as well as poetry by others, that the novel was imbued with the themes of atheism, social tolerance, social justice, reform, and antipathy to monarchism that only he advocated, and that there were noticeable motifs and subjects in the novel which only he espoused, such as vegetarianism, pantheism, alchemy, incest, male friendship, and scientific discovery.

However, editor Marilyn Butler, in her introduction and explanatory notes to the Oxford Press "1818 Text" edition of the novel, attributes these apparent coincidences to Percy's admiration and emulation of Mary's father, novelist William Godwin, whose works share numerous similarities in style, ideology, and subject matter with the novels of both Percy and Mary.

English literature scholars Phyllis Zimmerman, Phillip Wade, Stephen C. Behrendt, and Johnathan Glance compared the two early Shelley Gothic horror novels Zastrozzi (1810) and St. Irvyne (1811) with Frankenstein and found them to be precursors of the latter novel, containing the same or similar ideas, themes, structure, plot, and characters. Zastrozzi is a novel of pursuit and revenge where an atheist antagonist seeks to destroy his victim and his progeny. He can kill his victim at any time, but instead seeks to torture and slowly kill his victim by destroying and killing everything he loves. In St. Irvyne, the plot centers around an alchemist, Ginotti, who has a lifelong goal to find the secret of life by the study of "natural philosophy", to attain immortality. It is also a plot of pursuit where the alchemist seeks to impart the secret of eternal life to Wolfstein, the protagonist. There is even a poem in St. Irvyne on the reanimation of a corpse, the nun Rosa. Both novels rely extensively on John Milton's Paradise Lost, containing epigraphs like in Frankenstein, and contain poetry intertwined throughout the novel, a distinctive feature of Frankenstein as well. These novels were also published anonymously.

Other authors have noted that Percy Shelley did not originate the aforementioned ideas, themes, structure, plots or character types. As Marilyn Butler observes in her introduction and notes to the "1818 Text" edition, Percy admired and sought approbation from Mary's famous father, in whose works can be seen numerous similarities with both "Frankenstein" and Percy's above-listed novels. Among these similarities are: tragic action narrated in the first person by an isolated intellectual ("Fleetwood" and "Caleb Williams"); enmity between two powerful characters with antithetical ideologies who pursue each other in a complex and shifting chase ("Mandeville" and Caleb Williams); and the story of a selfish intellectual who trades domestic happiness and marital love for scientific knowledge, success and power ("St. Leon"). It is arguable, therefore, that any similarities between Percy's novels and Frankenstein can be attributed to Percy's emulation of Godwin rather than his supposed authorship of his wife's novel.

In 1996, Charles E. Robinson published a transcribed edition of the Frankenstein manuscripts together with a chronology of the work's composition. From these it is possible to see that Percy Shelley's contribution to the novel is of between 4,000 and 5,000 words of the novel's 72,000 word total. Robinson wrote that from the manuscripts it was evident that Mary Shelley was the "creative genius" behind the work, while Percy's contribution was akin to that which a publisher's editor would provide. Robinson's assessment, however, evolved and changed over time. In 2008, he grudgingly gave Percy Bysshe Shelley credit for his contributions to the novel, creating a media firestorm and scholarly frenzy and debate. This was the first time in two centuries that Shelley had received any credit for his contributions. In 2015, his view changed to the point where he admitted that the question remained open and should be explored further.

References

Bibliography
Adams, Stephen. "Percy Bysshe Shelley helped wife Mary write Frankenstein, claims professor: Mary Shelley received extensive help in writing Frankenstein from her husband, Percy Bysshe Shelley, a leading academic has claimed." Telegraph, 24 August 2008. Charles E. Robinson: "He made very significant changes in words, themes and style. The book should now be credited as 'by Mary Shelley with Percy Shelley'."
Chapin, Lisbeth. "Shelley's Great Chain of Being: From 'blind worms' to 'new-fledged eagles'" in Humans and Other Animals in Eighteenth-Century British Culture: Representation, Hybridity, Ethics, edited by Frank Palmeri. Hampshire, UK: Ashgate, 2006. The animal most cited in Percy Bysshe Shelley's works is the worm. The dominant symbolic image for death in Frankenstein is the worm.
Goulding, Christopher. (2002). "The real Doctor Frankenstein?" Journal of the Royal Society of Medicine, 95(5): 257–9. Christopher Goulding: "My thesis is that she [Mary Shelley] got what science she knew from Percy Shelley."
de Hart, Scott D. Shelley Unbound: Discovering Frankenstein's True Creator. Foreword by Joseph P. Farrell. Port Townsend, WA: Feral House, 2013.
de Hart, Scott D. and Joseph P. Farrell. Transhumanism: A Grimoire of Alchemical Agendas. Port Townsend, WA: Feral House, 2012.
Grande, James. "The Original Frankenstein, By Mary Shelley with Percy Shelley ed Charles E Robinson. To what extent did Percy Bysshe Shelley work on 'Frankenstein'? A new analysis reveals all." 16 November 2008, The Independent. Retrieved 30 September 2018.
Huet, Marie Hélène. Monstrous Imagination. Cambridge, MA: Harvard University Press, 1993.
King-Hele Desmond. (1967). "Shelley and Dr Lind." Keats-Shelley Memorial Bulletin, 18: 1–6.
Lauritsen, John. The Man Who Wrote Frankenstein. Dorchester, MA: Pagan Press, 2007.
Lauritsen, John. (Spring 2007). "Debunking the Mary Shelley Legend", Gay & Lesbian Humanist.
Lauritsen, John. (June, 2018). "The Real Frankenstein and Its Author", Mensa Bulletin: The Magazine of American Mensa, 24–25. 
Lauritsen, John. (October, 2018). "The True Author of Frankenstein", Academic Questions, 1–8.
Mellor, Anne K. Mary Shelley: Her Life, Her Fiction, Her Monsters. United Kingdom, Taylor & Francis, 2012.
Murray, E.B. (1978). "Shelley's Contribution to Mary's Frankenstein," Keats-Shelley Memorial Bulletin, 29, 50–68.
Murray-Fennell, Michael. "Did Mary Shelley really write Frankenstein?", Country Life, May 7, 2017.
Owchar, Nick. "The Siren's Call: An epic poet as Mary Shelley's co-author. A new edition of 'Frankenstein' shows the contributions of her husband, Percy." Los Angeles Times, 11 October 2009.
Paglia, Camille (March 14, 2007). "Mary Shelley debunked." Salon. Retrieved 20 April 2018.
Rhodes, Jerry. "New paperback by UD professor offers two versions of Frankenstein tale." UDaily, University of Delaware, 30 September 2009. Charles E. Robinson: "These italics used for Percy Shelley's words make even more visible the half-dozen or so places where, in his own voice, he made substantial additions to the 'draft' of Frankenstein."
Rieger, James. Edited, with variant readings, an Introduction, and, Notes by. Frankenstein; or the Modern Prometheus: The 1818 Text. Chicago and London: University of Chicago Press, 1982.
Rieger, James. "Dr. Polidori and the Genesis of Frankenstein." SEL: Studies in English Literature 1500–1900, 3 (Winter 1963), 461–72.
Robinson, Charles E., ed. The Original Frankenstein by Mary Wollstonecraft Shelley (with Percy Bysshe Shelley). New York: Vintage Books, 2008.
Robinson, Charles E. "Percy Bysshe Shelley's Text(s) in Mary Wollstonecraft Shelley's Frankenstein", in The Neglected Shelley edited by Alan M. Weinberg and Timothy Webb. London and New York: Routledge, 2015, pp. 117–136.
Robinson, Charles E. "Frankenstein: Its Composition and Publication" in The Cambridge Companion to Frankenstein edited by Andrew Smith. Cambridge, UK: Cambridge University Press, 2016, p. 16.  
Rosner, Victoria. "Co-Creating a Monster." The Huffington Post, 29 September 2009. "Random House recently published a new edition of the novel Frankenstein with a surprising change: Mary Shelley is no longer identified as the novel's sole author. Instead, the cover reads 'Mary Shelley (with Percy Shelley).'"
"Scot's monster role played up". BBC News, May 1, 2002. "[Mary] Shelley: Knew little of science". Christopher Goulding: "[W]e might now give some credit to the time spent six years previously by her husband-to-be in the study of a retired Scots physician in Windsor."
 Shelley, Mary, with Percy Shelley. The Original Frankenstein. Edited and with an Introduction by Charles E. Robinson. Oxford: The Bodleian Library, 2008. 
 Shelley, Percy Bysshe. "Reviews: On 'Frankenstein'." The Athenaeum, London, Sunday, November 10, 1832., No. 263, page 730.
 Wade, Phillip. "Shelley and the Miltonic Element in Mary Shelley's Frankenstein." Milton and the Romantics, 2 (December 1976), 23–25. A scene from Zastrozzi is re-invoked in Frankenstein.
Zimmerman, Phyllis. Shelley's Fiction. Los Angeles, CA: Darami Press, 1998.

Literature controversies
Authorship debates
Books about Percy Bysshe Shelley
Gothic fiction
Fringe theories
Frankenstein